Holmstrow Hundred was an administrative unit in the Rape of Lewes in the eastern division of the county of Sussex, until the abolition of hundreds in the 19th century. It contained the villages of Meeching (now Newhaven), Piddinghoe, Telscombe, Southease and Rodmell.

References

Hundreds of Sussex